Phelsuma modesta leiogaster Mertens, 1973 is a subspecies of geckos.

Scientific synonyms 
 Phelsuma lineata leiogaster Mertens, 1973 
 Phelsuma lineata leiogaster – Meier, 1982 
 Phelsuma leiogaster – Meier, 1989 
 Phelsuma leiogaster leiogaster – Glaw & Vences, 1994

References 
 Henkel, F.-W. and W. Schmidt (1995) Amphibien und Reptilien Madagaskars, der Maskarenen, Seychellen und Komoren. Ulmer Stuttgart. 
 McKeown, Sean (1993) The general care and maintenance of day geckos. Advanced Vivarium Systems, Lakeside CA.

Reptiles of Madagascar
Phelsuma
Taxa named by Robert Mertens
Reptiles described in 1973